Les Deux Mondes de Joe Dassin (or The Two Words of Joe Dassin) is the second French studio album by Joe Dassin. It came out in 1967 or early 1968 on CBS.

Half the songs on the album were in French, and half the songs were in English.

Track listing

References

External links 
 

1967 albums
Joe Dassin albums
CBS Disques albums

Albums produced by Jacques Plait